San Jose Succotz is a Maya village in Cayo District, Belize, consisting mainly of people of Yucatec Maya descent. According to the 2010 census, it has a population of 2,322 people in 472 households. San Jose Succotz was founded in the 1860s and mostly settled by refugees of the Caste War of Yucatán.

References

Populated places in Cayo District
Cayo West